Paracles uruguayensis is a moth of the subfamily Arctiinae first described by Carlos Berg in 1886. It is found in Uruguay.

Adults have a pale grey-yellow pattern.

Taxonomy
The species was synonymised with Paracles vulpina by George Hampson in 1901. Research in 2014 concluded it is a valid species.

References

Moths described in 1886
Paracles